The Godfrey Lowell Cabot Science Library is a library at Harvard University. It predominantly serves undergraduate students. The library opened in 1973 as part of the Harvard Science Center and was named after Godfrey Lowell Cabot, a Harvard graduate and chemist. 

The library was transformed in 2016, with more flexible spaces and updated media resources.

References

External links 
 Cabot Library Website

Harvard University buildings
Science libraries in the United States